The 2004 Voyageurs Cup was the third Voyageurs Cup tournament which was started by the Canadian supporters group The Voyageurs. The 2004 Edition of the competition featured the expansion Edmonton Aviators as well as the four 2003 teams: Calgary Storm (now Calgary Mustangs), Montreal Impact, Toronto Lynx and Vancouver Whitecaps.

Similar to the 2003 Voyageurs Cup competition Montreal Impact built up an early lead with three wins and a draw in the competition's first four games that the other teams could not overcome even though Montreal Impact only clinched their third Voyageurs Cup in a row in their last match with a 2–0 over Edmonton FC on Aug. 25 (the competition's penultimate match).

Format

The competition was set up on the league principle with each team playing two matches (home and away) against each other team for a total of eight matches per team. The entire competition totaled twenty matches.  All matches were part of the 2004 USL A-League regular season with the last home and away matches included when more than two matches were played due to the unbalanced league schedule.  In each match, 3 points are awarded for a win, 1 point is awarded for a draw, and 0 points are awarded for a loss. The five teams are ranked according to the total number of points obtained in all matches.

The team ranked highest after all matches have been played was the champion awarded the 2004 Voyageurs Cup.

Standings

Schedule

Champion

Top scorers

References

2004
2004 in Canadian soccer
2004 domestic association football cups